Carter Hill is a historic home located near Lebanon, Russell County, Virginia. It was built in 1921–1922 for Dale Carter Lampkin and his widowed brother-in-law William Wallace Bird. The hilltop manor house was initially the seat of a 1,000 acre farm, now reduced to about 250 acres. The tall two-story, brick sheathed frame includes three bays and was built in the Colonial Revival style with Flemish bond brick veneer.

The side gable roof features green-glazed terra cotta tiles and pedimented and hipped dormer windows.  It also has a projecting temple-fronted center bay, a hipped ell and several rear shed wings.

The front facade features a two-story pedimented portico supported by monumental cast iron columns with fluted shafts and Ionic order capitals. Also on the property is a contributing family cemetery. It was listed on the National Register of Historic Places in 2000.

References

Houses on the National Register of Historic Places in Virginia
Colonial Revival architecture in Virginia
Houses completed in 1922
Houses in Russell County, Virginia
National Register of Historic Places in Russell County, Virginia